Synaptotagmin-2 is a protein that in humans is encoded by the SYT2 gene.

References

Further reading